Tamarack Swamp is a boreal (non-glacial) bog in Sproul State Forest, in Clinton County, Pennsylvania, in the United States. It is named for the tamarack tree, which inhabits the wetland. Numerous other species of plants and animals also inhabit the wetland. The total area of the wetland is 4000 acres. The Tamarack Swamp Natural Area is located in the wetland.

Location and description
Tamarack Swamp is located in northern Clinton County, Pennsylvania. It is northeast of the community of Tamarack and north of the borough of Renovo and close to Pennsylvania Route 144, which is near the western edge of the wetland. The wetland has a total area of 4000 acres.

Tamarack Swamp serves as the headwaters of Drury Run. Kettle Creek is located to the north of the wetland.

Biology
Tamarack Swamp is home to the tamarack tree, which is the only deciduous conifer in Pennsylvania. Most of the trees in it are boreal conifers, though black spruce, and balsam fir are also species of trees that live in the wetland. Plants living in the wetland include Hooker's orchid, soft-leaved sedge and small floating manna grass.

Hemlock, Sphagnum mosses, and  some Canadian fauna were also found in Tamarack Swamp in the early 1900s, with hemlocks being found as late as 1940.

Tamarack Swamp is considered an Important Bird Area by Audubon Pennsylvania. Bird species in the wetland include Aegolius acadicus, Buteo platypterus, Coccyzus erythropthalmus, Empidonax alnorum, Melospiza georgiana, Myiarchus crinitus, Parkesia noveboracensis, Rallus limicola, and Vermivora chrysoptera. Five rare species of dragonfly are found in the area.

Black bears live in Tamarack Swamp, as well as red-spotted newts and wood frogs.

Meadows of sedge and the stumps of white pine trees occupy the southern part of Tamarack Swamp. There are also cattails and alders in the southern part of the wetland. The northern borders of the wetland are home to a population of red and white oaks. The carnivorous sundew plant is also found in the wetland.

History
In around 1827, Alexander Kelly, Montgomery Kelly, George Kelly, and Samuel Kelly settled on the western side of Tamarack Swamp. In approximately 1865, James Hennessy discovered several moose antlers buried in the wetland, indicating that moose once lived there.

In a 1925 book by Francis R. Cope, Tamarack Swamp was mentioned. Cope referred to the wetland as "a little oasis in the desert...". In the 1990s, the Western Pennsylvania Conservancy added over 9400 acres to Sproul State Forest. This land includes Tamarack Swamp.

In the early 1900s, parts of Tamarack Swamp, such as the southern part have been affected by logging and development. Logging was done as late as the 1940s, when Hicks Jennings cut down the only remaining virgin spruce in Tamarack Swamp. By 1947, the tamarack and black spruce trees in the wetland were significantly less healthy than they had been around 1900. The bird species olive-sided flycatcher, brown creeper, and winter wren have become extinct in the wetland since 1925. A report from the late 1940s mentioned that pitcher plants in the wetland.

Uses
There are plans to develop the Tamarack Swamp area. There are also plans to drill for oil and natural gas in the wetland. Natural gas pipelines have been laid in the swamp.

The land that Tamarack Swamp is situated on has multiple owners. A total of 267 acres of the wetland forms the Tamarack Swamp Natural Area.

A Natural Heritage Inventory in 2000 called Tamarack Swap "one of the most unique natural features in the county [Clinton County]". The United States Forest Service has designated one-third of the wetland as the Tamarack Swamp Natural Area DA. Tamarack Swamp is named one of the top 100 birding sites in Pennsylvania by the Pennsylvania Game Commission.

See also
List of bogs
Tannersville Cranberry Bog

References

External links
Image

Appalachian bogs
Landforms of Clinton County, Pennsylvania
Bogs of Pennsylvania